The ālāpiṇī vīṇā and the eka-tantrī vīṇā were medieval stick-zither and tube-zither veenas in India, with single strings and gourd resonators. The instruments became prominent in Indian music after 500 C.E. as instruments of court music. They replaced the harp-style veenas and lute-style veenas. The instruments were used in Southeast Asia, both mainland and island nations, and were recorded in sculpture and relief sculpture.

Although the tube zithers and stick zithers are very similar, it is possible that they have different origins. Early paintings of stick zithers in India date back at least to the 5th century C.E. The earliest currently known stick zither is in the Caves of Ajanta at the end of the 5th century. After a period of assuming that tube zithers spread from India to Southeast Asia, modern scholars have been trying to decide if the tube zithers might have originated in Southeast Asia and spread to India. Whatever the origins, Indian influence on musical culture in Southeast Asia is recorded in the archaeological remains of past civilizations.

References

External links
Photo showing a stick zither version with double gourd resonators at Kailasanathar Temple, Kanchipuram, Tamil Nadu, India Alcove 47
Video, about the tuila.
Video, tuila being played.
Pala dynasty (8th-early 12th centuries) Vishnu with attendants early 12th century, National Galleries of Australia. Eka-tantri style tube zither. Musician using stick for slide.
Vishnu and Attendants, Virginia Museum of Fine Arts. Alapini vina style stick zither with gourd resonator being played held to the musician's chest, like alapini vina.
Stele of Vishnu and attendants, 10th-11th century, Pala dynasty, 10th–12th century, Indian, Black schist. Princeton University Art Museum. Musician playing eka-tantri style tube zither.

Stick zithers
Tube zithers
Indian musical instruments
Chordophones
Musical instruments of Assam
Laotian musical instruments
Vietnamese musical instruments
Indonesian musical instruments
Malaysian musical instruments